Ezekiel J. Ingersoll (November 18, 1836–February 26, 1925) was an American businessman and politician.

Ingersoll was born in Greensburg, Indiana. In 1838, he moved to Paris, Illinois with his family. In 1859, Ingersoll moved to Carbondale, Illinois and was involved with the jewelry business. He served in the 73rd Illinois Infantry Regiment during the American Civil War and was commissioned captain. After the war, he returned to Carbondale and resumed his jewelry business. Ingersoll served as mayor of Carbondale. He also served on the board of education and was a Republican. Ingersoll served in the Illinois House of Representatives in 1895 and 1896. He served on the Southern Illinois University Carbondale Board of Trustees. Ingersoll died at his home in Carbondale, Illinois after suffering a stroke.

Notes

External links

1836 births
1925 deaths
People from Carbondale, Illinois
People from Greensburg, Indiana
People of Illinois in the American Civil War
American jewellers
Businesspeople from Illinois
Southern Illinois University Carbondale
School board members in Illinois
Mayors of places in Illinois
Republican Party members of the Illinois House of Representatives